Pieno žvaigždės Arena is a small multifunctional arena in Pasvalys. It was opened in 2011. Arena's capacity is 1,500 spectators. It has running tracks, pit, separate boxing hall, 25-meter three-pool tracks and a bathhouse complex.

Gallery

References

External links
 

Indoor arenas in Lithuania
Basketball venues in Lithuania
Pasvalys
Sport in Pasvalys
Buildings and structures in Panevėžys County